"Bachelor Kisses" is a song by the Australian alternative rock band The Go-Betweens that was released as the second single from their third album Spring Hill Fair in 1984. The single was issued in the UK and Australia on Sire Records. "Bachelor Kisses" was the Go-Betweens' first real attempt at a commercial single.

History
Robert Forster later said of the song, "Grant wrote this. It sounded like a pop song right from the word go. He was a very, very melodic songwriter.  "Bachelor Kisses" was just something that rolled off and felt very natural and beautiful. It's amazing." McLennan said, "I'm sorry if it sounds a courtly song but it's not about that. I see a lot of infidelity around me most people involved in music are guilty of it in many cases. I see a lot of trust, promises being broken – I'm guilty of it myself. It's about all the promises the world of men have made women as far as the future of their lives, security, the raising of children, and I've found it wanting. Not a unique thought."

Originally recorded with John Brand with the other songs on Spring Hill Fair, the song was re-recorded with producers Colin Fairley and Robert Andrews for the single release at the insistence of the record label. Forster complained of, "new producers, more days on the bass drum, and a version of the song of no great variance to the Miraval take." The song features backing vocalists from Ana da Silva, the lead singer for British post-punk band The Raincoats.

The single and the album failed to chart in the UK or Australia resulting in the band being dropped by Sire Records. "Bachelor Kisses" was however voted in at No. 72 in Triple J's Hottest 100 for 1989

Sire paid for a promotional video, featuring the band miming mixed with beach scenes. Forster said, "the black-and-white stuff of the band playing is actually very, very good. Then we shot some stuff, down at Brighton, of the water and stuff. They can print up colours. And they just went mad."

Reception

In a review of the song on Allmusic, Ned Raggett, comments that such a comparison is both worthwhile and not misplaced. He goes on to state that the song "has the rich, world-weary beauty one might expect from that singer in her 1980s work, but the song is very much a Go-Betweens song through and through. There's the same gentle but clear tension in the rhythm section, the crystalline but never overbearing guitar, the sense of deeper roots but a clearly modern performance"

In Mat Snow's review in the October, 1984 edition of NME he states "Only when we're confronted with a song so perfectly turned, lines so finely balanced and a melody so achingly sweet as Bachelor Kisses are we forced to notice how hollow most contemporary pop rings." Elsewhere in NME, Biba Kopf called the song, "an affecting male rejoinder to "Diamonds Are a Girl's Best Friend".

Track listing

Personnel

Go-Betweens
 Robert Forster — vocals, guitar
 Grant McLennan — vocals, guitar
 Lindy Morrison — drums
 Robert Vickers — bass

Additional musicians
 Robert Andrews — keyboards
 Ana da Silva — backing vocals

Release history

Covers
Swedish band, The Radio Dept., recorded an exclusive cover of "Bachelor Kisses", for the August 2007 issue of the Swedish fanzine I Godan Ro. Only 10 copies of that issue were printed. The track was subsequently included in their compilation album Passive Aggressive: Singles 2002–2010.

References

1984 singles
The Go-Betweens songs
1984 songs
Sire Records singles
Songs written by Grant McLennan
Songs written by Robert Forster (musician)